Piha is a village in Lääneranna Parish, Pärnu County, in southwestern Estonia. It had a population of 24 on 1 January 2011.

References

Villages in Pärnu County